Walter Raynbird (1 June 1854 – 6 May 1891) was an English first-class cricketer.

Raynbird made two first-class appearances for Hampshire, making his debut against local rivals Sussex in 1880. Raynbird made his second and final first-class appearance for Hampshire against Sussex in 1881.

Raynbird founded Hackwood Park Cricket Club and later in life was the manager of Lord Bolton's estates.

Raynbird died in Basing, Hampshire, on 6 May 1921.

Family
Raynbird's brother, Robert Raynbird represented Hampshire in a single first-class match in 1878.

External links
Walter Raynbird at Cricinfo
Walter Raynbird at CricketArchive

1854 births
1891 deaths
People from Old Basing
English cricketers
Hampshire cricketers